Pentapodus emeryii, the purple threadfin bream, is a threadfin bream inhabiting coastal reefs in North-western Australia and the Malay Archipelago. They are purplish-blue with a bright yellow stripe from the eye to the tail, have long filaments at the tip of each caudal lobe, and can grow to 25 cm in length.

References

External links
 

Fish of Indonesia
Nemipteridae
Fish described in 1843